A tuner is a subsystem that receives radio frequency (RF) transmissions, such as FM broadcasting, and converts the selected carrier frequency and its associated bandwidth into a fixed frequency that is suitable for further processing, usually because a lower frequency is used on the output.  Broadcast FM/AM transmissions usually feed this intermediate frequency (IF) directly into a demodulator that converts the radio signal into audio-frequency signals that can be fed into an amplifier to drive a loudspeaker.

More complex transmissions like PAL/NTSC (TV), DAB (digital radio), DVB-T/DVB-S/DVB-C (digital TV) etc. use a wider frequency bandwidth, often with several subcarriers.  These are transmitted inside the receiver as an intermediate frequency (IF).  Subcarriers are then processed like real radio transmissions, but the whole bandwidth is sampled with an analog-to-digital converter (A/D) at a rate faster than the Nyquist rate (that is, at least twice the IF frequency).

A tuner can also refer to a radio receiver or standalone audio component that is part of an audio system such as a hi-fi or stereo, to be connected to a separate amplifier.  The verb tuning in radio contexts means adjusting the receiver to detect the desired radio signal carrier frequency that a particular radio station uses.

Design 

The simplest tuner consists of an inductor and capacitor connected in parallel, where the capacitor  or inductor is made to be variable. This creates a resonant circuit which responds to an alternating current at one frequency. Combined with a detector, also known as a demodulator (diode D1 in the circuit), it becomes the simplest radio receiver, often called a crystal set.

Older models would realize manual tuning by means of mechanically operated ganged variable capacitors. Often several sections would be provided on a tuning capacitor, to tune several stages of the receiver in tandem, or to allow switching between different frequency bands. A later method used a potentiometer supplying a variable voltage to varactor diodes in the local oscillator and tank circuits of front end tuner, for electronic tuning.

Modern radio tuners use a superheterodyne receiver with tuning selected by adjustment of the frequency of a local oscillator. This system shifts the radio frequency of interest to a fixed frequency so that it can be tuned with fixed-frequency band-pass filter. Still later, phase locked loop methods were used, with microprocessor control.

In a self-contained radio receiver for audio, the signal from the detector after the tuner is run through a volume control and to an amplifier stage. The amplifier feeds either an internal speaker or headphones. In a tuner component of an audio system (for example, a home high-fidelity system or a public address system in a building), the output of the detector is connected to a separate external system of amplifiers and speakers.

The broadcast audio FM band ( in most countries) is around  higher in frequency than the AM band and provides enough space for a bandwidth of   This bandwidth is sufficient to transmit both stereo channels with almost the full hearing range. Sometimes, additional subcarriers are used for unrelated audio or data transmissions.  The left and right audio signals must be combined into a single signal which is applied to the modulation input of the transmitter; this is done by the addition of an inaudible subcarrier signal to the FM broadcast signal. FM stereo allows left and right channels to be transmitted.  The availability of FM stereo, a quieter VHF broadcast band, and better fidelity led to the specialization of FM broadcasting in music, tending to leave AM broadcasting with spoken-word material.

AM/FM tuners

Standalone audio stereo FM tuners are sought after for audiophile and TV/FM DX applications, especially those produced in the 1970s and early 1980s, when performance and manufacturing standards were among the highest. In many instances the tuner may be modified to improve performance. Electronics specialists and hobbyists buy, collect and restore vintage FM or AM/FM audio tuners on the secondary market. The restoration usually begins with replacing the electrolytic capacitors that may age over time. The tuner is outfitted with improved tolerance and better sounding upgraded parts. Prices have increased relative to the increasing demand for the older audio tuners. Those with the most value are the best sounding, most rare (collectible), the best DX capable (distance reception) and the known build quality of the component, as it left the factory.

Most of the early tuner models were designed and manufactured to receive only the AM broadcast band. As FM became more popular, the limitations of AM became more apparent, and FM became the primary listening focus, especially for stereo and music broadcasting. 

The McIntosh MR78 is known as one of the first FM tuners precise enough to tune into a weaker station broadcast on the same frequency as another stronger signal. 

In Europe, where a second AM broadcast band is used for longwave broadcasting, tuners may be fitted with both the standard medium wave and the additional longwave band. However, radios with only medium wave are also common, especially in countries where there are no longwave broadcasters. Rarely, radios are sold with only FM and longwave, but no medium wave band. Some tuners may also be equipped with one or more short wave bands.

Television

A television tuner converts a radio frequency analog television or digital television transmission into audio and video signals which can be further processed to produce sound and a picture. Different tuners are used for different television standards such as PAL, NTSC, ATSC, SECAM, DVB-C, DVB-T, DVB-T2, ISDB, T-DMB, open cable.

Before the use of solid-state frequency synthesizers, covering the broad range of TV signal frequencies with a single tuned circuit and sufficient precision was uneconomic. Television channel frequencies were non-contiguous, with many non-broadcast services interleaved between VHF channels 6 and 7 in North America, for example. Instead, TV tuners of the era incorporated multiple sets of tuned circuits for the main signal path and local oscillator circuit.  These "turret" tuners mechanically switched the receiving circuits by rotating a knob to select the desired channel.  Channels were presented in fixed sequence, with no means to skip channels unused in a particular area. When UHF TV broadcasting was made available, often two complete separate tuner stages were used, with separate tuning knobs for selection of VHF band and UHF band channels. To allow for a small amount of drift or misalignment of the tuner with the actual transmitted frequency, tuners of that era included a "fine tuning" knob to allow minor adjustment for best reception. The combination of high frequencies, multiple electrical contacts, and frequent changing of channels in the tuner made it a high maintenance part of the television receiver, as relatively small electrical or mechanical problems with the tuner would make the set unusable. 

Analog tuners can tune only analog signals. An ATSC tuner is a digital tuner that tunes digital signals only. Some digital tuners provide an analog bypass.

VHF/UHF TV tuners are rarely found as a separate component, but are incorporated into television sets. They provide outputs via composite, S-video, or component video. Many can be used with video monitors that do not have a TV tuner or direct video input. They are often part of a VCR or digital video recorder (DVR, PVR). Many home computers in the 1970s and 1980s used an RF modulator to connect to a TV set.

Personal computers may be fitted with expansion cards (typically with PCI or USB interface) providing a TV tuner and digital signal processor (DSP). They may be dedicated TV tuner cards, or incorporated into a video card. These cards allow a computer to display and capture television programs. Many earlier models were stand-alone tuners, designed only to deliver TV pictures through a VGA connector; this allowed viewing television on a computer display, but did not support recording television programs.

Smartphone and tablets can use a Micro USB DVB-T receiver to watch DVB-T TV.

Electronic tuner

An electronic tuner is a device which tunes across a part of the radio frequency spectrum by the application of a voltage or appropriate digital code words. This type of tuner supersedes mechanical tuners, which were tuned by manual adjustment of capacitance or inductance in the tuned circuits. In a more practical and everyday sense, a radio or television set which is tuned by manually turning a knob or dial contains a manual tuner into which the shaft of that knob or dial extends.

Early model televisions and radios were tuned by a rack of buttons; some of the earlier types were purely mechanical and adjusted the capacitance or inductance of the tuned circuit to a preset number of positions corresponding to the frequencies of popular local stations. Later electronic types used the varactor diode as a voltage controlled capacitance in the tuned circuit, to receive a number of preset voltages from the rack of buttons tuning the device instantly to local stations. The mechanical button rack was popular in car radios of the 1960s and 1970s. The electronic button rack controlling the new electronic varactor tuner was popular in television sets of the 1970s and 1980s.

Modern electronic tuners also use varactor diodes as the actual tuning elements, but the voltages which change their capacitance are obtained from a digital-to-analog converter (DAC) driven by a microprocessor or phase locked loop (PLL) arrangement. This modern form allows for very precise tuning and locking-in on weak signals, as well as a numerical display of the tuned frequency.

See also

 Analog passthrough
 ATSC tuner
 Bandspread
 Cable converter box
 Digital television adapter (DTA)
 Minimum detectable signal
 Mini PC
 QAM tuner
 Radio antenna
 Receiver (radio)
 Set-top box
 Television antenna
 Television set
 TV tuner card
 Network TV Tuner

References

External links

FM Tuner Information Center
World Radio History

Receiver (radio)
Set-top box
Wireless tuning and filtering
Radio electronics
Consumer electronics
pl:Amplituner